Moldavian Plain is a geographic area in the north east of Romania, one of the components of the Moldavian Plateau. Despite the name, Moldavian Plain is not flat, but a region dotted with hills, part of the Moldavian Plateau. 

Moldavian Plain is situate in the center-north part of the Moldavian Plateau. It has elevations of cca. 200 m, and is composed of the Upper and the Lower Jijia Plains.

Before 1940 the term used to mean Jijia Plain plus Middle Prut Valley, plus the Bălți steppe, because the three regions have an identical relief and natural vegetation. To make the things even more complicated, in Moldova sometimes Bălți steppe and Middle Prut Valley are lumped together into one term, Bălți steppe.

The Moldavian Plain is surrounded from all three sides by hills: Suceava Plateau to the west, the Northern Moldovan Plateau to the north, and the Bârlad Plateau to the south. The Plain is limited to the east by the Prut River  In the south of the western part lies the valley of the Jijia River, a tributary of the Prut.

The region is a traditional agricultural area, favored by several factors, such as the black earth (earth with a very high natural fertility), a high degree of deforestation that occurred in the 19th century, and the tradition. 

Crops, vegetables, industrial plants (such as tobacco), fruit trees (such as apple trees), fodder for livestock, and occasionally grapes, potatoes, and berry shrubs are cultivated. The agriculture is overwhelmingly dominant over the traditional vegetation, (deciduous) forests, and only occasionally forest steppes. 

Traditional wildlife - wolves, foxes, rabbits, boars, roes, storks, geese, ducks - are very rarely found outside a few remaining forests. A traditional horse growing area, the Moldavian Plain since the beginning of the 20th century has specialized in livestock (cows, sheep) and poultry.

Bibliography
 
 https://www.webcitation.org/query?url=http://www.geocities.com/dmarioara/subpodmo.htm&date=2009-10-25+21:00:25
 

Plateaus of Romania